ASK may refer to:

 ASK Group, a software company
 ASK Italian, a UK restaurant chain
 ASK Riga, a Latvian basketball club
 FK ASK, a Latvian former football club
 ASK1, apoptosis signal-regulating kinase 1
 Aaru Sundarimaarude Katha, a 2013 Malayalam thriller film
 American School of Kuwait
 Amplitude-shift keying, a type of signal modulation
 Årets Svenska Kvinna (ÅSK), Swedish Woman of the Year award
 Available seat kilometre, an airline's passenger carrying capacity
 Schleicher ASK 13, a glider aircraft
 IATA code for Yamoussoukro Airport

See also
Ask (disambiguation)

de:Ask
pl:Ask